is a town located in Chita District, Aichi Prefecture, Japan. This makes the city the most populous town in Aichi Prefecture, surpassing Takahama, Iwakura in population. The town is also the second most populous town in Japan, being surpassed by Fuchū, Hiroshima.

Geography
Higashiura is located in the northern tip of Chita Peninsula in southern Aichi Prefecture.

Neighboring municipalities
Aichi Prefecture
Kariya
Takahama
Ōbu
Chita
Tōkai
Handa
Agui

Demographics
Per Japanese census data, the population of Higashiura has been increasing steadily over the past 70 years.

In the 2010 census, a data padding boosting the population count to 50,088 was found, and the population count was readjusted back to 49,800 population.

Climate
The town has a climate characterized by characterized by hot and humid summers, and relatively mild winters (Köppen climate classification Cfa).  The average annual temperature in Higashiura is 15.7 °C. The average annual rainfall is 1604 mm with September as the wettest month. The temperatures are highest on average in August, at around 27.6 °C, and lowest in January, at around 4.4 °C.

History
The area around Higashiura has been settled since prehistoric times, and archaeologists have uncovered Jōmon period shell middens dating approximately 7000 BC. In the Sengoku period, the area was under the control of the Mizuno clan and was the birthplace of the mother of Tokugawa Ieyasu. In the Edo period, it was part of the holdings of Owari Domain.

The village of Higashiura was established on May 1, 1906 through the merger of five hamlets, all within Chita District. It was elevated to town status on June 1, 1948. But later in future, they will be elevated city.

In February 2012, after the town gave up attempting to be elevated to city status, there were doubts about potential data padding over populaion counts. In December 2010, there were anonymous mails prosectuting data padding to Ministry of Internal Affairs and Communications. The town was preparing to be elevated to city status as their population count was about to hit 50,000 which was the criteria to be elevated to city status. The population count in the 2010 census was 50,082. However, after re-examination by the Ministry of Internal Affairs and Communications, the revised population count was 49,800 so the elevation to the city status was postponed.　Later in, in the 2015 census, the population count was 49,238, being less than the 50,000 required to be elevated into city status, so the elevation was again postponed.

Economy
Higashiura is a regional commercial center and a bedroom community for Nagoya.

Education 
Higashiura has seven public elementary schools and three public junior high schools operated by the town government and one public high school operated by the Aichi Prefectural Board of Education.

Transportation

Railway
 Central Japan Railway Company - Taketoyo Line
-  -  - 
 The route of the Tōkaidō Main Line passes through Higashiura, but no stations are located within the town.

Highway

  Chitahantō Road

Local attractions
Odai Matsuri - held annually in April, Daimyo parades of Mizuno clan take place around the "Road of Odai" along the Myoutokuji river.

References

External links 

  

 
Towns in Aichi Prefecture
Populated coastal places in Japan